Ryszard Grzegorczyk (20 September 1939 – 5 November 2021) was a Polish footballer who played as a midfielder. He made 23 appearances for the Poland national team, scoring two goals.

He died on 5 November 2021.

References

External links
 

1939 births
2021 deaths
Sportspeople from Bytom
Polish footballers
Association football midfielders
Poland international footballers
Polonia Bytom players
RC Lens players
Ligue 1 players
Ligue 2 players
Olympic footballers of Poland
Footballers at the 1960 Summer Olympics
Polish expatriate footballers
Polish expatriate sportspeople in France
Expatriate footballers in France